Dhantulasi is a village in Uttar Pradesh, Sant Ravidas Nagar District, Uttar Pradesh State. Dhantulasi is 3.9 km  from Itahara Uparwar, 40.8 km from its District Main City Gyanpur and 224 km from its State Main City Lucknow

Demographics 

As of 2001 India census, Dhantulasi had a population of 1536. Males constitute 49%(756) of the population and females 51%(780).

References 

www.facebook.com/karangupta.co
http://censusindia.gov.in/PopulationFinder/Sub_Districts_Master.aspx?state_code=09&district_code=68

Villages in Bhadohi district
/* References */ facebook.com/dhantulsi.sadan